Wampum Ecological Reserve is an ecological reserve located within Sandilands Provincial Forest, Manitoba, Canada. It was established in 1978 under the Manitoba Crown Lands Act.

See also
 List of ecological reserves in Manitoba
 List of protected areas of Manitoba

References

External links
 iNaturalist: Wampum Ecological Reserve

Protected areas established in 1978
Ecological reserves of Manitoba
Nature reserves in Manitoba
Protected areas of Manitoba